Li Ming (born 26 January 1971) is a Chinese football coach and a former international player.

As a footballer, he played as a midfielder and spent his whole career with Dalian Wanda FC where he won eight league titles and three Chinese FA Cups. His international career saw him play for the Chinese national team gathering 86 international appearances between 1992 and 2004, scoring 8 goals. He represented his nation at four editions of the AFC Asian Cup, helping his team to a third-place finish in 1992, the quarter-finals in 1996, a fourth-place finish in 2000 and a second-place finish in 2004, which China hosted.

Playing career
Li Ming was born in Jinan, Shandong. Starting his football career in 1989, Li Ming would spend his entire football career with Dalian Wanda FC. He soon established himself as the club's first choice right-midfielder, however it was not until the 1994 league season that Dalian would win their first professional league title. With the help of Li Ming, the club soon established themselves as the dominant team within China for severals seasons. From 1994 to 2002 Dalian would win a staggering eight league titles; Li Ming was one of the stars of the Dalian Wanda team that went the entire 1996 league season without losing a single domestic league game. Li missed out on China's maiden appearance at the 2002 FIFA World Cup due to an injury during the qualification campaign.

Personal life
His son, Li Sirong, also went on to be a footballer.

Career statistics

International goals

Honours

Player
Dalian Wanda
Chinese Jia-A League/Chinese Super League: 1994, 1996, 1997, 1998, 2000, 2001, 2002, 2005
Chinese FA Cup: 1992, 2001, 2005

Individual
Golden Foot: 2017, as a legend

References

External links
 

1971 births
Living people
Chinese football managers
Chinese footballers
Footballers from Shandong
China international footballers
1992 AFC Asian Cup players
1996 AFC Asian Cup players
2000 AFC Asian Cup players
2004 AFC Asian Cup players
Dalian Shide F.C. players
Asian Games silver medalists for China
Medalists at the 1994 Asian Games
Asian Games medalists in football
Association football midfielders
Footballers at the 1994 Asian Games
Beijing Guoan F.C. non-playing staff